Stick bass (musical instrument) may refer to:

 Electric upright bass
 Stick Bass (SB8), the bass version of the Chapman Stick